Concrete, North Dakota, was established early in the 20th century as a townsite to support the cement mine southwest of the town at the base of the Pembina Escarpment. It is located just north of the Tongue River on the east edge of Beaulieu Township, in the northeast quarter of Section 30, in Pembina County. Despite the assurances of geologists associated with the University of North Dakota, the quality of the cement was too poor to be commercially profitable. They hoodwinked the businessmen of the towns of Mountain and Gardar and the many farmers along the way to support building a railroad, to branch from the Great Northern Railway line at Edinburg to the cement mine, then absconded shortly after completion of the Northern Dakota Railway. The railroad remained in operation for about two decades, but was never feasible. Concrete likely reached its maximum size in 1909, the year the cement mine closed. The town shrunk and now it is basically a ghost town. About two miles southeast of the townsite is the Cavalier Air Force Station, now part of the Space Force.

References

Pembina County, North Dakota